The 1995 Sun Bowl was a college football bowl game played on December 29, 1995 at the Sun Bowl in El Paso, Texas.  The game featured the Iowa Hawkeyes and the Washington Huskies.

Iowa scored first, after running back Sedrick Shaw rushed for a 58-yard touchdown, and a 7–0 Iowa lead. Kicker Brion Hurley added a 49-yard field goal, to make it 10–0 after one quarter of play.

In the second quarter, Iowa got a safety, increasing its lead to 12–0. Zach Bromert added a pair of 33 and 34-yard field goals, to push the lead to 18–0. Brion Hurley added a 47-yard field goal before half time to make the score 21–0 at the end of the half.

In the third quarter, Brion Hurley kicked a 50-yard field goal, to make the score 24–0. Washington finally got on the board after quarterback Shane Fortney threw a 30-yard touchdown pass to wide receiver Jerome Pathon to make it 24–6. Iowa's Michael Burger scored on a pair of touchdown runs to increase the lead to 38–6. Washington scored twice on touchdown passes by back-up quarterback Damon Huard to make the score more respectable.

After two straight bowl losses to Washington, in the 1982 Rose Bowl and the 1991 Rose Bowl, Iowa got a measure of revenge with the win.

References

External links
 USA Today recap of game

Sun Bowl
Sun Bowl
Iowa Hawkeyes football bowl games
Washington Huskies football bowl games
Sun Bowl
December 1995 sports events in the United States